Yarilovo is a rural locality (a village) in Podlesnoye Rural Settlement, Vologodsky District, Vologda Oblast, Russia. The population was 6 as of 2002.

Geography 
Yarilovo is located 8 km southeast of Vologda (the district's administrative centre) by road. Kozino is the nearest  locality.

References 

Rural localities in Vologodsky District